Rehnaa Hai Terre Dil Mein also known by the initialism RHTDM  is a 2001 Indian Hindi-language romantic drama film written and directed by Gautham Vasudev Menon, starring R. Madhavan, Saif Ali Khan and Dia Mirza in the lead roles. The film is a remake of the director's own Tamil film Minnale (released in the same year), which also starred Madhavan in his reprised role. This is Dia Mirza's debut film as well as Tamil actor, Madhavan's official Bollywood debut film after having an uncredited appearance in a song sequel during the mid-90s. Despite not being a commercial success at the time of release, the film had been had a lasting legacy and has become a cult classic over the years.

The film revolves around the love story of Madhav “Maddy” Shastri (Madhavan) and Reena Malhotra (Mirza). The latter is set to get engaged to Rajeev “Sam” Samra (Khan), who is a young man settled in the US and Maddy's former college rival.

Plot
The story starts with narration by Madhav "Maddy" Shastri (R. Madhavan). Maddy is the son of a music shop owner Deendayal Shastri (Anupam Kher) who hopes that Maddy will someday take over his shop. Instead, Maddy is a total brat, not serious about studies and notorious in his college. In contrast to him is his arch-rival Rajeev "Sam" Samra (Saif Ali Khan), a model student with whom Maddy is at constant loggerheads. The animosity goes so far that Maddy even tries to frame Sam. Sam challenges Maddy to a one-on-one fight, to which Maddy happily agrees. But the fight gets interrupted by the professors. Later at Sam's graduation party, Maddy again tries to challenge Sam, but this time, Sam denies it and lets him go. Sam graduates and leaves the college but promises Maddy that one day, he will complete what was started (i.e., the fight).

Three years later, Maddy is working as a software instructor at a private company. His attitude has mellowed a lot but not changed. On his trip to Delhi, he sees a girl dancing in the rain with some kids. He only gets a glimpse of her and is smitten by her beauty, calling her "my kinda girl." Later, he and his college cronies attend a former classmate's wedding where, by luck, Maddy spots the girl again and learns that her name is Reena Malhotra (Dia Mirza). He is deeply attracted to her and tries to learn more about her but in vain. However, destiny makes them meet again when he sees her in Mumbai. Soon he learns that Reena is set to get engaged to Rajeev – a childhood friend of hers, living in the USA. Maddy also learns that Reena doesn't know what Rajeev looks like now and that he is coming to India next week to meet her.

Maddy now heads over heels in love with Reena, is disheartened at the thought of losing his love. Upon being persuaded by his father and friends, Maddy decides to pretend to be Rajeev and tell Reena his true identity when the time is right. He shows his love for Reena and they spend a good time together in those five days. Reena, who previously liked him only as a friend, falls in love with him too. Everything goes well and Maddy decides to reveal his identity when Reena confesses her love to him. Unfortunately, before he can do so, the real Rajeev comes back and Reena is shocked to learn about Maddy's deception. She decides to call off her relationship with Maddy who tries to convince Reena about his true intentions, but she refuses to talk to him. Frustrated, Maddy decides to threaten Rajeev to back off from the marriage.

Maddy is shocked to see that Rajeev is no one but Sam, his college rival. Sam is even more infuriated to learn his impostor is actually his old rival in college whom he hates. Rajeev believes that Maddy got involved with Reena solely because of their rivalry. Maddy tries to talk to Reena and tell her the truth sincerely, but she is still not convinced of him. After his repeated attempts to talk to Reena fail, Rajeev and Reena's wedding date is decided. Maddy and his friends go beat up Rajiv, but Maddy lets Rajeev go back to Reena and tells his friends that they all committed a grave mistake and suggests them to forget about her. However, Reena later realises that she actually started falling in love with Maddy, despite his deception to her.

Finally, Rajeev confronts Reena and asks her whether she loves him or Maddy. In the meantime, Maddy decides to go to San Francisco, California, taking an offer made to him by his current employer, which initially he had declined, in order to ease his aching heart off his memories with Reena. When Rajeev realizes that Reena still loves Maddy, he takes her to the airport. Rajeev and Maddy spot each other. Maddy thinks that Rajeev has come to rebuke him once more. Reena and Maddy confess their feelings to each other. Rajeev is heartbroken but feigns his old attitude towards Maddy saying that "we can never be friends" and wishes them well. Reena and Maddy unite once again.

Cast
R.Madhavan as Madhav "Maddy" Shastri, and Reena's lover.
Dia Mirza as Reena Malhotra, Rajeev's fiancé and Maddy's lover.
Saif Ali Khan as Rajeev "Sam" Samra, Reena's fiancé and Maddy’s rival.  
Vrajesh Hirjee as Vikram "Vicky", Maddy's friend.
Tannaz Irani as Shruti, Vicky's love interest. 
Anupam Kher as Deendayal Shastri, Maddy's father. 
Navin Nischol as Mahesh Malhotra, Reena's father.
Smita Jaykar as Mrs. Malhotra, Reena's mother.
Hemant Pandey as the lorry driver whose lorry collides with Madhav's motorcycle carrying Vicky.
Kabir Sadanand as Madhav's friend
Gautham Vasudev Menon as Madhav's software company's boss. (cameo)
Jackky Bhagnani as the bouquet deliveryman to Reena. (cameo)
Sarita Birje (Madhavan's real-life wife) as a student in Madhav's tutorial class. (cameo)

Production
The success of the Tamil film Minnale led to producer Vashu Bhagnani signing Gautham Vasudev Menon on to direct the Hindi language remake of the film with Rajshri Productions, Rehna Hai Tere Dil Mein, which also featured Madhavan. An early title for the film was Koi Mil Gaya, before the team finalised Rehnaa Hai Terre Dil Mein. The former title was used by Rakesh Roshan for his 2003 film. Though Richa Pallod was initially considered for the leading female role, Dia Mirza and Saif Ali Khan were added to the film. Menon was initially apprehensive but said it took "half an hour" to agree and against his intentions, the producer opted against retaining the technical crew of the original. He changed a few elements, deleted certain scenes and added some more for the version. The team shot for the film in South Africa and shot scenes at Durban Beach and in Drakensberg, with production executive Raakesh Maharaj arranging the unit's stay in the country.

Release
In comparison to Minnale (2001), the film gained mixed reviews with a critic citing that "the presentation is not absorbing" though stating that the director " handled certain sequences with aplomb"; the film subsequently went on to become an average grosser at the box office. A critic from The Hindu wrote it "is not a bad bargain at the end of a long day" and "there are parts where you would actually enjoy the courting game between a game hero and a gorgeous heroine" with "fine one-liners and good gestures", before adding "a part does not a whole make". The moderate performance of the film left the director disappointed, with Menon claiming in hindsight that the film lacked the simplicity of the original with the producer's intervention affecting proceedings.

However, the film belatedly gained popularity through screenings on television and subsequently developed a cult following amongst young audiences. In 2011, the producer of the film approached him to remake the film with the producer's son Jackky Bhagnani in the lead role, but Menon was uninterested with the offer. On the fifteenth anniversary of the film's release, actors Madhavan and Dia Mirza met up and released a video thanking the film's admirers for their adulation.

Soundtrack

The score and songs were composed by Harris Jayaraj, with lyrics written by Sameer. The last three tracks were bonus tracks and did not feature in the film. Upon release "Zara Zara" ,  "Sach Keh Raha Hai" and "Kaise Main Kahoon Tujhse"  topped the Bollywood music charts and the album received positive reviews from critics. The songs are still popular today. All tunes except 'Rehnaa Hai Tere Dil Mein' and 'Dil Ko Tumse' were from the original Tamil film Minnale's soundtrack and 'Dil Ko Tumse' was reused in Tamil-language as 'Ondra Renda Aasaigal' in the 2003 Tamil film Kaakha Kaakha by Harris himself.

References

External links
 
 ZARA ZARA LYRICS – REHNAA HAI TERE DIL MEIN

2001 romantic drama films
Indian romantic drama films
2001 films
Films directed by Gautham Vasudev Menon
Films shot in Uttarakhand
Hindi remakes of Tamil films
Films scored by Harris Jayaraj
2000s Hindi-language films
Films scored by Anand Raj Anand
Films scored by Vishal–Shekhar